John Sharples (1814 – 19 December 1876) was a Canadian lumberman, shipbuilder and politician.

Born in Lancashire, England, Sharples emigrated to Canada in 1827 settling in Lower Canada. He worked in the lumber industry in Quebec and later built three ships. He was mayor of Sillery. He was also a director and vice-president of the Union Bank of Lower Canada. In 1874, he was appointed to the Legislative Council of Quebec for the division of Stadacona. He died while in office in 1876.

His son, John Sharples Jr., was also a member of the Legislative Council.

References
 
 

1814 births
1876 deaths
English emigrants to pre-Confederation Quebec
Mayors of places in Quebec
Conservative Party of Quebec MLCs
Anglophone Quebec people
Immigrants to Lower Canada